Jeff Solomon is an ice hockey executive who was the Interim General manager of the Anaheim Ducks of the National Hockey League.

On November 9, 2021, the Anaheim Ducks announced that Solomon had been named interim general manager; he was replaced by Pat Verbeek on February 3, 2022.

Prior to working for the Ducks, Solomon held a management role with the Los Angeles Kings for many years.

References

1958 births
Living people
National Hockey League general managers
Anaheim Ducks executives